Riddles, Ruins & Revelations is the tenth studio album by Norwegian gothic metal band Sirenia. It was released on 12 February 2021 via Napalm Records. The first single "Addiction No. 1" was released on 8 December 2020, along with a music video. The second single, "We Come to Ruins", was released on 12 January 2021. On 10 February 2021, the band released their third single which is a cover of French singer Desireless, "Voyage, voyage".

It was elected by Metal Hammer as the 24th best symphonic metal album.

Background 
Riddles, Ruins & Revelations was recorded and produced in its entirety at Morten Veland's personal studio (Audio Avenue Studios) in Tau, Norway in mid-2020. It is the first album of the band that does not feature additional recordings in Marseille with the mixed French symphonic choir (called the Sirenian Choir).

Sirenia's tenth album is a remarkable stylistic shift for the group, adding synth-pop to their usual symphonic metal musical style, opting for a more commercial bet which included the release of two music videos.

Certainly, the band moved away from the traditional gothic and symphonic sound that characterized them in the past, twenty years after their foundation. Veland said:

Track listing

Personnel 
Credits for Riddles, Ruins & Revelations adapted from liner notes.

Sirenia
Morten Veland – harsh and clean vocals, guitars, bass, keyboards, programming, mixing, mastering, engineering
Emmanuelle Zoldan – female vocals, French translation
Nils Courbaron – guitars
Michael Brush – drums

Additional musician
 Joakim Næss – clean vocals in "Downwards Spiral"

Production
 Gyula Havancsák – cover art, design, layout
 Richelle ter Heege – photography

Charts

References 

2021 albums
Sirenia (band) albums
Napalm Records albums